The Twenty20 Blaze, officially the West Indies Cricket Board Women's Twenty20 Blaze and previously known as the West Indies Cricket Board Regional Women's Twenty20 Championship, is a women's Twenty20 cricket competition organised by Cricket West Indies.

The competition began in 2012 and subsequently took place in 2013, 2016, 2018 and 2019. The tournament currently features six Caribbean teams competing in a round-robin group stage. The competition runs alongside the Women's Super50 Cup. 

The current champions are Jamaica, who won the competition in 2022 after the 2020 and 2021 tournaments were cancelled due to the COVID-19 pandemic.

History
The tournament began in 2012, as the West Indies Cricket Board Regional Women's Twenty20 Championship. The tournament was a round-robin of eight teams, with a subsequent final, along with 3rd, 5th and 7th place play-offs. Jamaica were the inaugural winners of the tournament, beating Trinidad and Tobago in the final, with Jamaica captain Stafanie Taylor being named Player of the Tournament. The following season, 2013, the eight teams were divided into two groups of four, with the top two in each group proceeding to the semi-finals. Jamaica won the tournament a second time, beating Barbados in the final.

The tournament was then not played until 2016, and was also reduced to six teams, with Leeward Islands and Windward Islands replacing the teams representing their constituent nations. The teams played in two groups of three with the winner of each group progressing to the final, in which Trinidad and Tobago beat Jamaica. In 2018, the six teams played in a round-robin group, with Barbados being crowned champions after topping the group.

The next tournament was played in the 2018–19 season, being played in March and April 2019, and was renamed the Twenty20 Blaze. The same format as the previous season was retained, and Barbados again won the tournament, claiming their second title.

The tournaments scheduled to take place in 2020 and 2021 were cancelled due to the COVID-19 pandemic. Due to the postponements, the most recent winner of the competition, Barbados, qualified to participate in the 2022 Commonwealth Games. The Twenty20 Blaze returned in June 2022, with Jamaica winning their third title.

Teams

Roll of Honour

See also
 Women's Super50 Cup

References

Twenty20 Blaze
West Indian domestic cricket competitions
Women's cricket competitions in the West Indies
Recurring sporting events established in 2012
Twenty20 cricket leagues